The 1900 Philadelphia Phillies season was the 18th season for the National League franchise. The Phillies finished the season in third place in the National League with a record of 75–63. Bill Shettsline managed the Phillies, who played their home games at National League Park. The Phillies' lineup featured three future Hall of Famers in Ed Delahanty, Nap Lajoie, and Elmer Flick. The team finished second in hitting (.290) and first in attendance with 4,313 fans per game.

Regular season

Sign Stealing and Discovery 
On September 17, 1900, at home in game 1 of a doubleheader against the Cincinnati Reds, the Phillies were discovered to have been stealing opponents' signs using hidden wires and an electronic device. Phillies’ backup catcher Morgan Murphy sat in center field by the team’s centfielder lockers and offices at the Phillies' ball park. The Phillies ran wires under the field from the seat to a battery-powered device buried in the dirt beneath the third-base coach’s box. Murphy spotted the opposing catcher’s signals to the pitcher and signaled once for a fastball and twice for a breaking ball. Phillies infielder Pearce Chiles coached third-base, received the signal beneath his feet, and then signaled to the batter. In the third inning, Cincinnati’s Tommy Corcoran walked to the third-base coach’s box and began digging at the dirt with his cleats. Before the Phillies' groundskeeper could stop him, Corcoran had unearthed the electronic box and showed it to umpire Tim Hurst. Hurst disciplined no one, signaled the game to continue, and is reported to have shouted, “Back to the mines, men!”.

Season standings

Record vs. opponents

Roster

Player stats

Batting

Starters by position 
Note: Pos = Position; G = Games played; AB = At bats; H = Hits; Avg. = Batting average; HR = Home runs; RBI = Runs batted in

Other batters 
Note: G = Games played; AB = At bats; H = Hits; Avg. = Batting average; HR = Home runs; RBI = Runs batted in

Pitching

Starting pitchers 
Note: G = Games pitched; IP = Innings pitched; W = Wins; L = Losses; ERA = Earned run average; SO = Strikeouts

Other pitchers 
Note: G = Games pitched; IP = Innings pitched; W = Wins; L = Losses; ERA = Earned run average; SO = Strikeouts

Relief pitchers 
Note: G = Games pitched; W = Wins; L = Losses; SV = Saves; ERA = Earned run average; SO = Strikeouts

References

External links
1900 Philadelphia Phillies season at Baseball Reference

Philadelphia Phillies seasons
Philadelphia Phillies season
Penn